Sobia Kamal is a Pakistani politician had been a member of the National Assembly of Pakistan from August 2018 till Jan 2023.

Political career

She was elected to the National Assembly of Pakistan as a candidate of Pakistan Tehreek-e-Insaf (PTI) on a reserved seat for women from Punjab in 2018 Pakistani general election.

During her tenure as Member of the National Assembly, she served as Federal Parliamentary Secretary for Kashmir Affairs and Gilgit Baltistan.

References

Living people
Punjabi people
Women members of the National Assembly of Pakistan
Pakistani MNAs 2018–2023
Pakistan Tehreek-e-Insaf MNAs
Year of birth missing (living people)
21st-century Pakistani women politicians